Albania has an embassy in Lisbon and 3 honorary consulates in Porto, Funchal and in the island of Madeira. Portugal has an honorary consulate in Tirana. The history of diplomatic relations of Albania and Portugal dates back to 1922, when Portugal recognized Albania's independence on May 25, 1922.

The countries are both members of the North Atlantic Treaty Organization (NATO). As a European Union (EU) member, Portugal supports Albania in its euro-integration path.

Economic relations 
In 2010, the bilateral Chamber of Commerce and Industry Cusmara de Comércio e Industria Luso Albanesa has been founded. In 2016, Portugal has exported carriage in worth of 6.10 million euros (compared in 2012 only 2.16 million euros) to Albania. 31.8% of the products were chemical-pharmaceutical products mostly from the BIAL company, 19.2% agricultural products, 14.7% metal products, 13.3% paper and cellulose and 5.4% machinery and equipment.

Cultural relations  
The Luso-Albanian Foundation, Luso-Illyrian Institute for Human Development founded in 2007, is considered one of the major cultural bilateral relationships between Albania and Portugal. The foundation initiates and supports a variety of projects in education, culture, sciences, research and development cooperation, particularly in administration and organization management. In 2012, an office was opened in Tirana. There are also offices in Prague and Brussels.

See also 
 Foreign relations of Albania
 Foreign relations of Portugal
 Accession of Albania to the European Union

External links 
 Albanian Embassy in Lisbon

References 

 

 
Portugal
Bilateral relations of Portugal